Donald Lee Fuell (born 1938) an American-born football quarterback. College scouts began seeking his services when he was in the 10th grade at Marshall County High School in rural Alabama.

Don's high school honors included football All-American, baseball All-State and basketball All-District. His high school coach, Joe Chorba, said of Fuell, "He was a cut above all the other boys I ever coached. He was much of a man."

Don Fuell still claims several Guntersville Wildcat records which include 23 touchdown passes in a career, 14 touchdown passes in a season, longest pass play (85 yards), and quarterbacking Guntersville's only 10-0 team (1955).

At The University of Southern Mississippi, Fuell was selected Mr. USM, senior Most Valuable Player, and president of the 1962 graduating class. A College All-American, Fuell played in the Blue–Gray Football Classic, Senior Bowl, and College All-Star games. In the Senior Bowl, he shares the kicking record with six converted points after a touchdown. Fuell was inducted into the USM Hall of Fame in 1983.

Before starting on a distinguished business career with Lockheed-Martin, Fuell's professional football career lasted from 1962 to 1967 included stints with the Houston Oilers, Toronto Argonauts, Montreal Alouettes and Orlando Panthers.

1938 births
Living people
People from Guntersville, Alabama
Players of American football from Alabama
Canadian football quarterbacks
Toronto Argonauts players
Montreal Alouettes players
American football quarterbacks
American players of Canadian football
Houston Oilers players
Southern Miss Golden Eagles football players